was a professional Japanese baseball player and manager.

External links

1911 births
1984 deaths
Baseball people from Kagawa Prefecture
Waseda University alumni
Japanese baseball players
Nippon Professional Baseball infielders
Yomiuri Giants players
Managers of baseball teams in Japan
Yomiuri Giants managers
Seibu Lions managers
Yokohama DeNA BayStars managers
Osaka Kintetsu Buffaloes managers
Tokyo Yakult Swallows managers
Japanese Baseball Hall of Fame inductees